Igreja de Santo Antônio is a church located in São Paulo, Brazil. Established in 1592, the current church was completed between 1899 and 1919.

References

Roman Catholic churches in São Paulo
1592 establishments in South America
Roman Catholic churches completed in 1919
20th-century Roman Catholic church buildings in Brazil